Peter Olsson may refer to:

Peter A. Olsson (born 1941), American psychiatrist and psychoanalyst
Peter Olsson (motorsports driver) (born 1971), former professional racing driver
Peter Olsson (bassist) (born 1961), Swedish rock musician
Peter Olsson (alpine skier) (born 1979), Swedish alpine skier

See also
Pete Olson (born 1962), U.S. Representative
Peter B. Olsen (1848-1926), American newspaper editor
Richard Olsen (Peter Richard Olsen, 1911-1956), Danish Olympic rower